{{DISPLAYTITLE:C26H44N7O17P3S}}
The molecular formula C26H44N7O17P3S (molar mass: 851.65 g/mol, exact mass: 851.1727 u) may refer to:

 Isovaleryl-CoA
 2-Methylbutyryl-CoA